At least two ships of the French Navy have been named Pallas:

  a  launched in 1813 as Colosse and renamed Pallas in 1821 on conversion to a frigate
  a  launched in 1938 and scuttled in 1942

French Navy ship names